Dead Indian Creek is a stream in Park County, Wyoming, in the United States. It lies at the base of Dead Indian Pass.

According to tradition Dead Indian Creek was named for a Bannock Indian killed nearby.

Dead Indian Creek bisects the Dead Indian Campground.

References

Rivers of Park County, Wyoming
Rivers of Wyoming